Cornelis "Kees" Broekman (2 July 1927 – 8 November 1992) was a Dutch speed skater.

At the 1952 Olympics in Oslo Broekman was silver medalist on both the 5000 meter and the 10000 meter, the first ever Winter Olympic medals for the Netherlands. He won a silver medal at the World Allround Speed Skating Championships for Men 1949, and became European champion 1953.

In the 1950s Broekman moved to Norway, where he competed until the 1960 Summer Olympics. After the Games he retired to become a speed skating coach, bringing Atje Keulen-Deelstra and Göran Claeson to world titles. He later coached speed skating in Berlin, where he died at age 65.

He was an uncle of the Olympic speed skater Stien Kaiser.

References

External links

1927 births
1992 deaths
Dutch male speed skaters
Dutch speed skating coaches
Dutch sports coaches
Olympic speed skaters of the Netherlands
Speed skaters at the 1948 Winter Olympics
Speed skaters at the 1952 Winter Olympics
Speed skaters at the 1956 Winter Olympics
Speed skaters at the 1960 Winter Olympics
Olympic silver medalists for the Netherlands
Olympic medalists in speed skating
Medalists at the 1952 Winter Olympics
People from De Lier
World Allround Speed Skating Championships medalists
Sportspeople from South Holland